The Douglas Underpass is a concrete underpass in Douglas, Arizona, allowing U.S. Highway 80 (US 80) to pass under the Southern Pacific Railroad tracks in 1936. It was added to the National Register of Historic Places on June 30, 1988.

In 1935 the underpass was engineered by the Arizona Highway Department, as a two-span reinforced concrete slab. Funded by monies from the 1935 federal relief bill, construction began in March 1936 by Jack A. Casson, a contractor from Phoenix, Arizona. He completed the structure by November at a cost of $122,687 (equivalent to $ in ), and the underpass was officially opened on November 7, 1936. When the underpass was completed, it marked the final grade-crossing to be done away with on the cross-country US 80. When the underpass was opened it was met by great fanfare from the town. At the opening ceremony, state highway engineer T. S. O'Connell remarked, "This underpass is one of the outstanding works of its kind not only in Arizona but in the entire Southwest." It functioned unaltered through the 1990s.

In 1999 it was proposed that the underpass was too narrow, and that it should be demolished, and a new bypass created. It was eventually demolished in 2001.

References

National Register of Historic Places in Cochise County, Arizona
Tunnels in Arizona
Tunnels completed in 1936